is a passenger railway station located in the town of Sayō, Sayō District, Hyōgo Prefecture, Japan, It is operated by the third-sector semi-public railway operator Chizu Express.

Lines

Station layout
The station consists of one side platform serving a single bi-directional track on an embankment. The platform is on theft side of the track when facing in the direction of Chizu. It is connected to the log cabin style station building by stairs. The station is unattended.

Adjacent stations

|-
!colspan=5|Chizu Express

History
Ishii Station opened on December 3, 1994.  with the opening of the Chizu Line.

Passenger statistics
In fiscal 2018, the station was used by an average of 5 passengers daily..

Surrounding area
Japan National Route 373

See also
List of railway stations in Japan

References

External links

Officialhome page

Railway stations in Hyōgo Prefecture
Railway stations in Japan opened in 1994
Sayō, Hyōgo